Simon Măzărache (born 10 January 1993) is a Romanian professional footballer who plays as a forward for Liga I side Petrolul Ploiești. In his career, Măzărache also played for teams such as Muscelul Câmpulung, Universitatea Craiova, CS Mioveni or Farul Constanța, among others.

Honours
Petrolul Ploiești
Liga II: 2021–22

References

External links
 
 

1993 births
Living people
Romanian footballers
Association football forwards
Liga I players
Liga II players
Liga III players
CS Universitatea Craiova players
ASC Daco-Getica București players
CS Concordia Chiajna players
CS Mioveni players
FCV Farul Constanța players
FC Petrolul Ploiești players